Classical Cebuano (Badlit: pre-virama: ,) was a form of the Cebuano language spoken during the Spanish colonial era of the Philippines. It was the primary language spoken in Cebu, Bohol, and other parts of Visayas and Mindanao.

History 
The earliest surviving record of Cebuano was from a wordlist collected by Antonio Pigafetta during the Magellan expedition in 1521. The wordlist contains about 160 Cebuano words (some of which are in Malay) written in an Italian-influenced orthography, which is considered problematic due to its inconsistent and unphonetic spelling system. The oldest reliable glimpse of Cebuano's grammar and vocabulary was from Domingo Ezguerra's Arte de la Lengua Bisaya de la Provincia de Leyte, a Waray grammar book written in 1663. The first dedicated grammar book for Cebuano, Francisco Encina's Arte de la Lengua Zebuana, was compiled in 1801 (40 years after his death).

Phonology 
The phonological system of Classical Cebuano was relatively minimal compared to Modern Cebuano, which has more phonological inventory due to the influence of foreign languages such as Spanish and English.

Vowels 
The Classical Cebuano phonemic inventory consists of three vowel phonemes (/a/, /i/, /u/). Some dialects of Modern Cebuano, particularly those in Bohol, have retained a close back unrounded vowel /ɯ/, which means it might have existed in Classical Cebuano, although unrecorded and possibly dialectal.

Consonants 
The Classical Cebuano phonemic inventory consisted of 15 consonant phonemes (in which /d/ and /r/ were treated as a single phoneme). The consonant /r/ was pronounced only when the phoneme /d/ was situated between two vowels. The natives described the final -d as a medial sound between /r/ and /d/.

Grammar

Case Markers 
Classical Cebuano possessed separate plural personal case markers (sa, na, and ka), which are not retained in any dialect of Modern Cebuano.

Pronouns 
Classical Cebuano underwent morphological changes throughout the Spanish period. One of the most notable was the change from *s(i)- to *k(i)- as the direct case-marking prefix for Cebuano demonstrative (e.g. sini -> kini) and interrogative (e.g. sinsa -> kinsa) pronouns. Classical Cebuano, especially the one spoken in Bohol, still had plural case markers sa, na, and ka, which are already obsolete in Modern Cebuano. These were also used to form plural demonstratives, which are considered rare among Philippine languages.

Personal Pronouns

Demonstratives

Interrogatives

See also 

 Cebuano language
 Cebuano grammar
 Bisayan languages
 Waray language
 Pigafetta's Dictionary

References 

Cebuano language
Languages of the Philippines
Verb–subject–object languages